Alexander Rafailovich Boikov (born February 3, 1975) is a Russian former professional ice hockey forward who played in the Kontinental Hockey League (KHL). He was a captain for HC Sibir Novosibirsk for two seasons. He ended his 21-year professional career, following the 2011-12 season with Severstal Cherepovets.

Career statistics

References

External links
 

1975 births
HC CSKA Moscow players
HC Lada Togliatti players
Living people
Ice hockey people from Moscow
Severstal Cherepovets players
HC Sibir Novosibirsk players
Russian ice hockey forwards